UFC Fight Night: Lewis vs. Hunt (also known as UFC Fight Night 110) was a mixed martial arts event produced by the Ultimate Fighting Championship held on 11 June 2017 at the Spark Arena in Auckland, New Zealand.

Background
The event was the second that the promotion has hosted in Auckland, following UFC Fight Night: Te Huna vs. Marquardt in June 2014.

A heavyweight bout between Derrick Lewis and the 2001 K-1 World Grand Prix winner and former interim title contender Mark Hunt served as the main event.

Former UFC Flyweight Championship challenger Joseph Benavidez was expected to face Ben Nguyen at the event. However, Benavidez pulled out of the fight citing a knee injury on 10 May. He was replaced by The Ultimate Fighter: Tournament of Champions flyweight winner and fellow former title challenger Tim Elliott.

The Ultimate Fighter: Brazil 3 middleweight winner Warlley Alves was expected to face Kiichi Kunimoto, but pulled out on May 18 due to an undisclosed injury and was replaced by Zak Ottow.

Promotional newcomer Nadia Kassem was scheduled to face JJ Aldrich, but pulled out on May 31 and was replaced by fellow newcomer Chan-Mi Jeon.

At the weigh-ins, Jeon came in at 118 lb, two pounds over the women's strawweight limit of 116 lb. As a result, she was fined 20% of the purse, which went to Aldrich and the bout proceeded as scheduled at a catchweight.

Just hours before the event, Thibault Gouti pulled out of a scheduled lightweight bout against Dong Hyun Ma due to illness, prompting Kim's removal as well.

Results

|-

Bonus awards
The following fighters were awarded $50,000 bonuses:
Fight of the Night: Mark Hunt vs. Derrick Lewis
Performance of the Night: Dan Hooker and Ben Nguyen

See also

List of UFC events
2017 in UFC

References

UFC Fight Night
Mixed martial arts in New Zealand
Sport in Auckland
2017 in mixed martial arts
2017 in New Zealand sport
June 2017 sports events in New Zealand